Yelena Piraynen (born 15 March 1969) is a Belarusian cross-country skier. She competed in four events at the 1994 Winter Olympics. She was the first woman to represent Belarus at the Olympics.

References

External links
 

1969 births
Living people
Belarusian female cross-country skiers
Olympic cross-country skiers of Belarus
Cross-country skiers at the 1994 Winter Olympics
Sportspeople from Minsk